WERZ (107.1 FM) is a radio station licensed to Exeter, New Hampshire. The station is owned by iHeartMedia. WERZ broadcasts from studios located on Lafayette Road in Portsmouth and from a transmitter located on Long Hill in Stratham. Its on-air call sign is "Z107, Exeter/Portsmouth". WERZ's signal serves the coastal area from Salem Harbor up north to Biddeford, Maine, including the Portsmouth and Dover-Rochester areas of New Hampshire, southern York County, Maine and northeastern Massachusetts, where it overlaps with sister station WXKS-FM from Boston.

History
The station went on the air September 21, 1972, as WKXR-FM. In March 1982, the call letters were changed to WERZ and the format was changed to Top 40/CHR. Their first slogan was "The New Z107, The Continuous Music FM", then later, "WERZ107, New Hampshire's Hot FM". The first program director was Jack O'Brien and the studios were located at 11 Downing Court in Exeter.

Boston area concert promoter Don Law's Precision Media purchased the station in 1986 and modified the format to a hybrid AC/Top 40 format (Hot AC), with the slogan, "The All New 107 FM WERZ, Playing Today's Hits And Yesterday's Classics". In 1989, WERZ had a slogan of "13 Hits in a row" and competed wildly against WHEB. Pete Falconi was Program Director and allowed air staff such as Lindsay Robins, Tim Fontaine, and Jeff the Doctor, to produce authentic, and unique radio shows. The result was pumping out as many hits an hour as possible, and providing the community of the Seacoast with live remote broadcasts. Ratings as per Arbitron (1989) competed well with WHEB.

Specialty weekend programs helped to boost ratings, including the legendary American Top 40 with Shadoe Stevens, the Weekly Top 40 with Rick Dees, and The WERZ's House Party Saturday Night featuring uptempo party songs and a megamix of popular dance music, as well as frequent prize giveaways and heavy listener interaction and requests.

WERZ was a Hot AC throughout all of the 2000s, during which their slogan was "The Hits of the '80s, the '90s, and today. We are 107.1 WERZ" (As with all prior iterations, the "we are Z..." was played off the call letters: We R Z...). For the first time in December 2008, WERZ went all-Christmas. After the holiday season, WERZ became an Adult Contemporary station playing an even bigger mix of the '80s, the '90's, and Today. Then, in December 2009, WERZ went Christmas again and this time returned as Hot AC with their fifth slogan, "The '80s, The '90s, and now are all on today's mix, 107.1 WERZ".

In February 2010, WSKX and WERZ announced that Matty in the Morning, syndicated by WXKS-FM out of Boston, would be moving from WSKX to WERZ.

On October 4, 2012, at 3 pm, WERZ flipped back to their Top 40/CHR roots as "The All New Z107, The Seacoast's Hit Music", reviving the format and branding that WERZ used from 1982 to 1986.

The WERZ DJs between 1982 and 2009

Willie B. Goode!
Jack O'Brien
Jeffrey Paradis
Sarah Sullivan
Brian Battle
Lisa G.
Jay Michaels
Samantha "The Wilde V." Wilde 
Timmy Rose
David W. DeFranzo - Dave Sandz
Corey Matthews
Arik "ARock" Pierce
Michael "Tommy Boy" Mullins
Chad Erickson
Valerie Scott
Zach Carter
Roy Sullivan
Michael "Mikey OD" O'Donnell
Kid Cruise
Kevin Matthews
Mark Matzell
Peter Falconi
Michael Rock
Audley Williams
Dom Armano
Jason "JJ" Wright
Dave Stevens
Lindsey Robbins
Tony Vincent
Timmy Fontaine
John Willis
Robert "K-Rob" Walker
Steve McVie
Dan Alexander
Tommy Record
Kenneth "Captain Ken" Spaulding
Eric Powers
Stella Mars
Andy Hartmann
Super Dave
Eddie Foxx
Jimmy "JR" Randall
Jeffrey "Dr. Jeff" Lawrence
Benji Hamilton
Jimmy Stevens
BB Good (who went to Radio Disney in the mid '90s)
Teigan Hart
Melissa Mathers
Bobby Lindner
Bobby Goodwin
Jackie Goddard
Johnny Collins
Patrick "Pat" St. John (Now on Sirius/XM's Classic Rewind)
Jason "Jammin' Jay" Brady
Peter Scott
Scott McKay
Gary Williams 
Charlie Phillips
Ben Hamilton
Mikey Thomas
Steve "Matt Taylor" Varholy
Peter Falconi
Ralphie Marino
Suzanne Lewis
Jay Brown
Eddie McMann
Glen Turner
Scotty Dee
Jeffrey Knight
Danny Steele
Beverly "Bev" Valentine
Shadoe Stevens
Rick Dees
Mike McGowan

References

External links

ERZ
Portsmouth, New Hampshire
Radio stations established in 1972
Exeter, New Hampshire
Contemporary hit radio stations in the United States
IHeartMedia radio stations